Bishop Lavis is a suburb of Cape Town, located  east of the city centre near Cape Town International Airport. It had, as of 2001, a population of 44,419 people, of whom 97% described themselves as Coloured, and 90% spoke Afrikaans while 9% spoke English. The official 2011 census gave the population figure as 26,482.

Bishop Lavis  is one of many townships  that was established in the Western Cape Province by the country's reigning regime at the introduction of apartheid in South Africa. During this period non-white citizens were moved from their lands and homes across the region (because it was abruptly designated for "whites only"), into these townships.

References

Suburbs of Cape Town